Jean Puech (born 22 February 1942, in Viviez) is a French politician. He was first a member of the Republican Party before joining the Union for a Popular Movement.

Between 1980 and 1993 and again between 1996 and 2008, he was a Senator. Between 1993 and 1995, he was Minister of Agriculture. Then in 1995 for a few months, he was Minister of the Civil service.

References

1942 births
Union for a Popular Movement politicians
French Ministers of Agriculture
French Ministers of Civil Service
Living people
French Senators of the Fifth Republic
People from Aveyron
20th-century French politicians
Senators of Aveyron